Geza Tumbas (born 7 June 1957) is a Yugoslav boxer. He competed in the men's lightweight event at the 1980 Summer Olympics.

References

1957 births
Living people
Yugoslav male boxers
Olympic boxers of Yugoslavia
Boxers at the 1980 Summer Olympics
Place of birth missing (living people)
Lightweight boxers